Hewitsonia danane, the Stempffer's tiger blue, is a butterfly in the family Lycaenidae. It is found in western Ivory Coast, southern Nigeria and central and western Cameroon.

The larvae feed on blue-green algae (cyanobacteria). They are associated with the ant species Oecophylla longinoda.

References

Butterflies described in 1969
Poritiinae